Rupert Huber (born 1973, in Traunstein) is a German physicist and University professor. Huber is known for his research in terahertz technology and semiconductor physics.

Career

Huber attended the Technical University of Munich where he majored in physics. He was awarded a PhD in 2003 from University of California, Berkeley. In 2010 he became a professor at the University of Regensburg.

Awards
2004: Feodor Lynen Research Fellowship from the Alexander von Humboldt Foundation
2007: Emmy-Noether grant and DFG junior research group
2008: European THz Young Investigator Award from the European Optical Society
2009: Rudolf Kaiser Prize of the Donors' Association for German Science
2012: ERC Starting Grant (European Research Council)  
2016: Prize for good teaching at the state universities in Bavaria 
2019: Gottfried Wilhelm Leibniz Prize
2019: Appointment as Fellow of the Optical Society of America (OSA)

References

External links
Publications

1973 births
Living people
21st-century German physicists
Technical University of Munich alumni
UC Berkeley College of Letters and Science alumni
Academic staff of the University of Regensburg